Daniel Grilo Azevedo (born 12 February 1998) is a Portuguese professional footballer who plays for Sertanense on loan from Académica as a goalkeeper.

Career statistics

Club

Honours
Benfica
UEFA Youth League runner-up: 2016–17

References

External links
 

1998 births
Living people
Footballers from Lisbon
Portuguese footballers
Portugal youth international footballers
Association football goalkeepers
S.L. Benfica B players
Associação Académica de Coimbra – O.A.F. players
Sertanense F.C. players
Liga Portugal 2 players
Campeonato de Portugal (league) players